Pleurodonte is a genus of air-breathing land snails, terrestrial pulmonate gastropod mollusks in the subfamily Pleurodontinae of the family Pleurodontidae. 

The genus Dentellaria Schumacher, 1817 is considered to be a synonym of Pleurodonte by Vera (2008), but Schileyko (2006) considered Dentellaria to be a separate genus.

Distribution 
The distribution of the genus Pleurodonte includes:
 Dominica (4 species)
 Jamaica (24 species)
 Colombia (when is Dentellaria considered as a synonym)

Species 

Species within the genus Pleurodonte include:
 Pleurodonte adamsiana Clapp, 1901
 Pleurodonte aureola Swainson
 Pleurodonte barbadensis Lamarck
 Pleurodonte dentiens (Férussac, 1822)
 † Pleurodonte desidens (Rang, 1834) - was endemic to Martinique
 Pleurodonte discolor (Férussac, 1821)
 Pleurodonte guadeloupensis(Pilsbry, 1889) 
 Pleurodonte hippocastaneum Lamarck, 1792
 Pleurodonte incerta (Férussac, 1823)
 Pleurodonte isabella Férussac, 1822
 Pleurodonte josephinae (Férussac, 1832)
 † Pleurodonte lehneri (Trechmann, 1935)
 Pleurodonte lychnuchus (Müller, 1774)
 Pleurodonte nigrescens (Wood, 1828)
 Pleurodonte nucleola Rang, 1835
 Pleurodonte orbiculata (Férussac, 1822)
 Pleurodonte pachygastra (Gray, 1834)
 Pleurodonte soror (Férussac, 1821)
 † Pleurodonte wilsoni B. Roth, 1984
Taxon inquirendum
  † Pleurodonte debooyi Bartsch, 1918 
 Pleurodonte obesa (Beck, 1837)
Species brought into synonymy
 Pleurodonte acuta  (Lamarck, 1816): synonym of Lucerna lamarckii (Férussac, 1821) (junior synonym)
 Pleurodonte acutangula (Burrow, 1815): synonym of Polydontes acutangula (Burrow, 1815) (unaccepted combination)
 Pleurodonte amabilis (C. B. Adams, 1850): synonym of Dentellaria amabilis (C. B. Adams, 1850)
 Pleurodonte anomala (Pfeiffer, 1849): synonym of Dentellaria anomala (Pfeiffer, 1849)
 Pleurodonte atavus (Pfeiffer, 1859): synonym of Dentellaria atavus (Pfeiffer, 1859)
 Pleurodonte bainbridgii (Pfeiffer, 1845): synonym of Lucerna bainbridgii (L. Pfeiffer, 1845)
 Pleurodonte bifurcata (Deshayes, 1838): synonym of Isomeria bifurcata (Deshayes, 1838): synonym of Labyrinthus bifurcatus (Deshayes, 1838) (unaccepted combination)
 Pleurodonte bizonalis (Deshayes, 1850): synonym of Caracolus bizonalis (Deshayes, 1850) (unaccepted combination)
 Pleurodonte bowdeniana Simpson, 1895 †: synonym of Lucerna bowdeniana (Simpson, 1895) † (new combination)
 Pleurodonte bronni (Pfeiffer, 1846): synonym of Dentellaria bronni (L. Pfeiffer, 1846)
 Pleurodonte browneana (L. Pfeiffer, 1862): synonym of Dentellaria tridentina (Férussac, 1832) (junior synonym)
 Pleurodonte candescens C. B. Adams, 1850: synonym of Dentellaria candescens (C. B. Adams, 1850)
 Pleurodonte cara (C. B. Adams, 1849): synonym of Dentellaria cara (C. B. Adams, 1849)
 Pleurodonte carmelita (Férussac, 1821): synonym of Lucerna mora (Gray in Griffith & Pidgeon, 1833)
 Pleurodonte carocolla (Linnaeus, 1758): synonym of Caracolus carocolla (Linnaeus, 1758) (unaccepted combination)
 Pleurodonte catadupae H. B. Baker, 1935: synonym of Dentellaria catadupae (H. B. Baker, 1935)
 Pleurodonte chemnitziana (Pfeiffer, 1845): synonym of Lucerna chemnitziana (L. Pfeiffer, 1845)
 Pleurodonte clappi Pilsbry, 1901: synonym of Labyrinthus clappi (Pilsbry, 1901) (original name)
 Pleurodonte crispata (Férussac, 1821): synonym of Hispaniolana crispatus (Férussac, 1821) (unaccepted combination)
 Pleurodonte crusta (Dall, 1890) †: synonym of  Cepolis (Plagioptycha) crusta (Dall, 1890) † represented as Cepolis crusta (Dall, 1890) †
 † Pleurodonte cunctator (Dall, 1890): synonym of Cepolis (Plagioptycha) cunctator (Dall, 1890)  represented as † Cepolis cunctator (Dall, 1890) 
 † Pleurodonte diespiter (Dall, 1890) : synonym of † Pleurodontites diespiter (Dall, 1890) 
 † Pleurodonte eohippina Cockerell, 1915 : synonym of † Eohipptychia eohippina (Cockerell, 1915)  (new combination)
 Pleurodonte fragilis Haas, 1949: synonym of Labyrinthus raimondii (Philippi, 1867) (junior synonym)
 Pleurodonte gigantea (Scopoli, 1786): synonym of Hispaniolana gigantea (Scopoli, 1786) (unaccepted combination)
 Pleurodonte goldmani Dall, 1912: synonym of Labyrinthus subplanatus sipunculatus (Forbes, 1850) (junior synonym)
 Pleurodonte gudeana Ancey, 1904: synonym of Isomeria basidens gudeana (Ancey, 1904) (original combination)
 Pleurodonte haruspica (Dall, 1890) †: synonym of Pleurodontites haruspica (Dall, 1890) †
 Pleurodonte hesperarche (Cockerell, 1914) †: synonym of Hodopoeus hesperarche (Cockerell, 1914) †
 Pleurodonte ingens (C. B. Adams, 1850): synonym of Lucerna lamarckii (Férussac, 1821)
 Pleurodonte invalida (C. B. Adams, 1850): synonym of Dentellaria invalida (C. B. Adams, 1850) (unaccepted combination)
 Pleurodonte kendrickensis Mansfield, 1937 †: synonym of Pleurodontites kendrickensis (Mansfield, 1937) † (new combination)
 Pleurodonte lima (Férussac, 1821): synonym of Granodomus lima (Férussac, 1821) (unaccepted combination)
 Pleurodonte lindsleyana (Vendryes, 1899): synonym of Dentellaria atavus (L. Pfeiffer, 1859) (junior synonym)
 Pleurodonte lucerna (Müller, 1774): synonym of Lucerna lucerna (O. F. Müller, 1774)
 Pleurodonte marginella (Gmelin, 1791): synonym of Caracolus marginella (Gmelin, 1791) (unaccepted combination)
 Pleurodonte michalkovaci H. Binder & Harzhauser, 2008 †: synonym of Pseudochloritis michalkovaci (H. Binder & Harzhauser, 2008) †
 Pleurodonte mora Gray in Griffith, 1834: synonym of Lucerna mora (Gray in Griffith & Pidgeon, 1833)
 † Pleurodonte norica H. Binder, 2004: synonym of † Pseudochloritis norica (H. Binder, 2004) 
 Pleurodonte okeniana (Pfeiffer, 1845): synonym of Dentellaria okeniana (L. Pfeiffer, 1845)
 Pleurodonte oxytenes (Pilsbry, 1889): synonym of Lucerna lucerna (O. F. Müller, 1774) (junior synonym)
 Pleurodonte pallescens (C. B. Adams, 1851): synonym of Dentellaria pallescens (C. B. Adams, 1851) (unaccepted combination)
 Pleurodonte peracutissima (C. B. Adams, 1845): synonym of Lucerna lucerna (O. F. Müller, 1774) (junior synonym)
 Pleurodonte picturata (C. B. Adams, 1849): synonym of Dentellaria picturata (C. B. Adams, 1849) (unaccepted combination)
 Pleurodonte pretiosa (C. B. Adams, 1851): synonym of Lucerna bainbridgii (L. Pfeiffer, 1845) (junior homonym of Helix pretiosa Albers, 1850)
 Pleurodonte schroeteriana (L. Pfeiffer, 1845): synonym of Dentellaria schroeteriana (L. Pfeiffer, 1845) (unaccepted combination)
 Pleurodonte simsoni (L. Pfeiffer, 1852): synonym of Dentellaria candescens (C. B. Adams, 1850) (junior synonym)
 Pleurodonte sinuata (Müller, 1774): synonym of Dentellaria sinuata (O. F. Müller, 1774) (unaccepted combination)
 Pleurodonte sloaneana (Pfeiffer, 1868): synonym of Dentellaria sloaneana (L. Pfeiffer, 1868) (unaccepted combination)
 Pleurodonte spengleriana (L. Pfeiffer, 1847): synonym of Lucerna bainbridgii (L. Pfeiffer, 1845) (junior synonym)
 Pleurodonte strangulata (C. B. Adams, 1849): synonym of Dentellaria strangulata (C. B. Adams, 1849) (unaccepted combination)
 Pleurodonte subacuta (Pfeiffer, 1867): synonym of Lucerna subacuta (L. Pfeiffer, 1867) (unaccepted combination)
 Pleurodonte sublucerna (Pilsbry, 1889): synonym of Lucerna sublucerna (Pilsbry, 1889) (unaccepted combination)
 Pleurodonte tenaculum Dall, 1909: synonym of Labyrinthus uncigerus (Petit, 1838) (junior synonym)
 Pleurodonte tridentina (Férussac, 1832): synonym of Lucerna sublucerna (Pilsbry, 1889) (unaccepted combination)
 Pleurodonte undulata (Férussac, 1821): synonym of Hispaniolana crispatus (Férussac, 1821) (based on an invalid original name)
 Pleurodonte vacillans Vendryes, 1902: synonym of Lucerna vacillans Vendryes, 1902 (unaccepted combination)
 Pleurodonte valida (C. B. Adams, 1850): synonym of Dentellaria valida (C. B. Adams, 1850) (unaccepted combination)

References

 Bank, R. A. (2017). Classification of the Recent terrestrial Gastropoda of the World. Last update: July 16th, 2017

External links
 Species in Discover Life
 Fischer von W. G. (1807). Museum Demidoff, ou, Catalogue systématique et raisonné des curiosités de la nature et de l'art: données à l'Université Impériale de Moscou par son excellence Monsieur Paul de Demidoff. Moscow: Imprimerie de Université Impériale de Moscou. 3: 300pp. 6pls
 Swainson, W. (1840). A treatise on malacology or shells and shell-fish. London, Longman. viii + 419 pp

Pleurodontidae
Gastropod genera